Sara Louise Hungerford (born 13 February 1986) is a former Australian cricketer. An all-rounder, she bats right-handed and is a right-arm medium pace bowler. After briefly playing List A cricket for Auckland during the 2006–07 season, Hungerford went on to represent the Australian Capital Territory (2009/10–2015/16) and Surrey (2012) in both List A and T20 cricket. She also played for the Sydney Sixers in the Women's Big Bash League (WBBL) during the 2015–16 season.

Hungerford was born in Sydney, New South Wales. Outside of cricket, she is a consultant physician and cardiologist. Australian Test all-rounder Greg Matthews has described Hungerford as his "guardian angel" due to her efforts in treating his life-threatening salmonellosis in 2014.

References

External links
 
 

1986 births
Living people
Australian cricketers
Australian women cricketers
Australian cardiologists
ACT Meteors cricketers
Auckland Hearts cricketers
Surrey women cricketers
Sydney Sixers (WBBL) cricketers
Cricketers from Sydney
Sportswomen from New South Wales
Australian expatriate cricketers in the United Kingdom
Australian expatriate sportspeople in England
Australian expatriate sportspeople in New Zealand